Mordellistena idahoensis is a beetle in the genus Mordellistena of the family Mordellidae. It was described in 1946 by Ray.

References

idahoensis
Beetles described in 1946